John Whelan Dulanty  (1883 – February 1955) was an Irish diplomat. He represented Ireland in London for 20 years, first as High Commissioner and then as Ireland's first Ambassador to the United Kingdom.

Biography

Dulanty was born in Manchester to a working-class Irish family. His father was from Tipperary and his mother from Limerick. He was educated at St. Mary's, Failsworth, and at Manchester University where he read law. In 1906 he supported Winston Churchill's campaign as a Liberal to win the Manchester North West seat. This connection with Churchill was to prove important in Dulanty's later diplomatic career as High Commissioner in London.

In 1913, he entered the Civil Service.
He worked in the Ministry of Munitions during World War I.
He later served as Assistant Secretary in the Treasury.
In 1920 he left the British civil service because of his opposition to British policy on Ireland. By the time he left he had been awarded C.B. and C.B.E.

For the next 6 years he served as deputy chairman and managing director of the department store Peter Jones, Ltd.

In 1926 he joined the Irish civil service and was appointed Commissioner for Trade in Great Britain. At that time he had not lived for any length of time in Ireland, but in the words of The Times, "There was no mistaking that he was an Irishman. He had been a leader of the United Irish League of Great Britain under John Redmond and had been busy behind the scenes at the time of the treaty of 1922".

In 1930, he became the last High Commissioner of the Irish Free State in London. In 1937, he became the only High Commissioner of Ireland, due to the 1937 Constitution of Ireland coming into effect on 29 December 1937.

On Ireland leaving the Commonwealth and becoming a republic, he became Ireland's first ambassador in London in 1950. He retired in September 1950.

References

1883 births
1955 deaths
Ambassadors of Ireland to the United Kingdom
High Commissioners of Ireland to the United Kingdom
People from Manchester
20th-century British civil servants
Commanders of the Order of the British Empire
Alumni of the University of Manchester
Companions of the Order of the Bath
British people of Irish descent
British businesspeople in retailing